Yehor Romanovych Yarmolyuk (born 1 March 2004), sometimes known as Yehor Yarmoliuk, is a Ukrainian professional footballer who plays for  club Brentford as a midfielder.

Yarmolyuk is a product of the Dnipro-1 academy and made his senior debut for the club in 2020. He transferred to Brentford in 2022. Yarmolyuk has been capped by Ukraine at youth level.

Club career

SC Dnipro-1 
A midfielder, Yarmolyuk is a product of a number of youth sportive schools of the Dnipropetrovsk Oblast and in May 2019, at age 15, he signed a three-year contract with Ukrainian Premier League club SC Dnipro-1. His progression was such that he made two first team appearances late in the 2019–20 season. Yarmolyuk's second appearance made him the second youngest player to start a match in the history of the Ukrainian top flight, at the age of 16 years and 140 days. Yarmolyuk signed a new three-year contract in October 2020. He went on to make 19 further appearances during the 2020–21 and 2021–22 seasons, before the latter season was curtailed due to the war in Ukraine. Yarmolyuk scored one senior goal for the club, in a 2–1 Ukrainian Cup round of 32 win over VPK-Ahro Shevchenkivka on 22 September 2021.

Brentford 
On 14 July 2022, Yarmolyuk transferred to Premier League club Brentford and signed a three-year contract, with the option of a further year. He began his Brentford career with the club's B team, but made two pre-season friendly substitute appearances for the first team. Following two Premier League matches as an unused substitute, Yarmolyuk made his senior debut for the club as a substitute during the second half of an EFL Cup shoot-out defeat to Gillingham on 8 November 2022. He was included in the first team squad for its mid-season training camp in Girona and made three friendly appearances during the period.

International career 
Yarmolyuk has been capped by Ukraine at youth level.

Career statistics

Honours 
Ukraine U15

 UEFA U15 Development Tournament: 2019
Individual

 Ukrainian Association of Football Best U15 Attacker: 2019

References

External links
Yehor Yarmolyuk at upl.ua
Yehor Yarmolyuk at brentfordfc.com
 

2004 births
Living people
People from Verkhnodniprovsk
Ukrainian footballers
Ukraine youth international footballers
Ukraine under-21 international footballers
Association football midfielders
SC Dnipro-1 players
Brentford F.C. players
Ukrainian Premier League players
Ukrainian expatriate footballers
Expatriate footballers in England
Ukrainian expatriate sportspeople in England
Sportspeople from Dnipropetrovsk Oblast